Kateryna Ivanivna Boloshkevich (19 May 1939 – 28 March 2018) was a Ukrainian weaver and statesperson who was a weaver at the  of the Ministry of Light Industry of the Ukrainian SSR and an elected deputy of the ninth convocation of the Supreme Soviet of the Ukrainian Soviet Socialist Republic. Previously, she worked at the  after she graduated from high school.

Biography
She visited the factory with other young girls to become acquainted with weaving and she was one of the first workers at the factory when it commenced operations as the most powerful of its time. During the ninth five-year plan, Boloshevich produced 6,798 linear meters of fabric, which twice exceeded the planned objective. She became the initiator of a movement to expand service areas to transport fabric, bringing the number of service machines from 24 to 36 instead of the usual 12 that improved labour productivity, for which she received a great amount of support from other weavers. She made 800,000 linear meters of linen fabrics in excess of the planned target during the tenth five-year plan. Boloshkevich taught weavers from other factories, while continuining to work at the plant until her retirement. 

She became a member of the Communist Party of the Soviet Union in 1967. Boloshkevich took an active part in public life, serving as an elected deputy of the ninth convocation of the Supreme Soviet of the Ukrainian Soviet Socialist Republic.

Personal life
She was resident of the city of Zhytomyr, Ukraine and died on 28 March 2018.

Awards
Boloshkevich was awarded the Order of the Red Banner of Labour on 5 April 1971. She was a two-time recipient of the Order of Lenin: Boloshevich first received the award on 20 February 1974 and again on 12 May 1977 with the title of Hero of Socialist Labour and the  "for outstanding success in fulfilling the plan for 1976 and accepted socialist obligations, achieving the highest labor productivity in the industry, personal contribution to increasing the production of high-quality consumer goods, great creative work on communist education and professional training young workers". In 1972, she received the Best Worker, light industry of the USSR medal "for her high labor performance" in which she made 98,000 metres of fabric.

References

1939 births
2018 deaths
People from Zhytomyr Oblast
20th-century Ukrainian women politicians
21st-century Ukrainian women
Weavers
20th-century women textile artists
Ukrainian women artists
Communist Party of the Soviet Union members
Soviet women in politics
Ninth convocation members of the Verkhovna Rada of the Ukrainian Soviet Socialist Republic
Recipients of the Order of Lenin
Heroes of Socialist Labour
Recipients of the Order of the Red Banner of Labour